This is a list of units of the Royal Air Force Regiment. The RAF Regiment is the ground fighting force of the Royal Air Force and is charged mainly with protecting military airfields, among other duties.

First formed in 1942 to protect the airfields against enemy attack, the Regiment's motto is Per Ardua - Through Adversity.  They are also known as Rock Apes.

Current field squadrons 

No. 1 Squadron RAF Regiment
No. II Squadron RAF Regiment
No. 15 Squadron RAF Regiment
No. 34 Squadron RAF Regiment
No. 51 Squadron RAF Regiment
No. 63 Squadron RAF Regiment (King's Colour Squadron)

RAuxAF Regiment

RAuxAF Regiment Squadrons

 = Active squadron according to:

RAuxAF Regiment Wings

Disbanded Units

Wings

Armoured Car Companies
No. 1 Armoured Car Company RAF
No. 2 Armoured Car Company RAF
No. 3 Armoured Car Company RAF

Armoured Car Squadrons
 No. 2702 Armoured Car Squadron RAF Interim redesignation between No. 2 Armoured Car Company RAF and No. II Squadron RAF Regiment

RAF Regiment Squadrons

001-200

2700-2799

2800-2899

2900-2999

Flights

See also

Royal Air Force

List of Royal Air Force aircraft squadrons
List of Royal Air Force aircraft independent flights
List of conversion units of the Royal Air Force
List of Royal Air Force Glider units
List of Royal Air Force Operational Training Units
List of Royal Air Force schools
List of Royal Air Force units & establishments
List of RAF squadron codes
List of RAF Regiment units
List of Battle of Britain squadrons
List of wings of the Royal Air Force
Royal Air Force roundels

Army Air Corps

List of Army Air Corps aircraft units

Fleet Air Arm

List of Fleet Air Arm aircraft squadrons
List of Fleet Air Arm groups
List of aircraft units of the Royal Navy
List of aircraft wings of the Royal Navy

Others

List of Air Training Corps squadrons
University Air Squadron
Air Experience Flight
Volunteer Gliding Squadron
United Kingdom military aircraft serial numbers
United Kingdom aircraft test serials
British military aircraft designation systems

References

Citations

Bibliography

RAF Regiment